Perpetrator studies is a nascent interdisciplinary, scholarly field of research into the perpetrators of mass killings and/or political violence. It is covered in Journal of Perpetrator Research and other publications.

Anthropologists, historians and political scientists are among those who have made contributions to the field. While the study of perpetrators has not been shown the same level of scholarly interest as studies of victims, some noteworthy studies have explored the actions and viewpoints of perpetrators, as well as the "processes through which genocide took shape" that have contributed to what scholars view as a phenomenon of mostly "ordinary people" becoming highly motivated to commit collective atrocities.

See also

International criminal law
 Perpetrator trauma

References

Further reading
 Bibliography of Genocide studies

genocide studies
Peace and conflict studies
Criminology